Feldflieger Abteilung (FFA, Field Flying Company) was the title of the pioneering field aviation units of what became the Luftstreitkräfte (German air service) by October 1916, during World War I.

Composition

The use of aircraft as a tactical reconnaissance tool, to serve within the Deutsches Heer's Fliegertruppen des deutschen Kaiserreiches air service formed in 1910, was established by the German Army in its annual exercise in June 1911. Early usage was limited to providing post-flight situation reports. At the start of World War I, there were thirty-three units, comprising one allocated to each of the eight Army Headquarters and one to each of the twenty-five regular Corps Headquarters. Each unit, having a designation number usually matching that of the army group it was assigned to, was equipped with either six Idflieg Category A (unarmed monoplane) or Category B (unarmed biplane) two-seater aircraft. By March 1915 the number of Feldflieger Abteilung had doubled and the ideas for separate specialist fighter and bomber units, known as Jastas and Kampfgeschwader, respectively, were beginning to be conceived, not forming formally under such names until the reformation of the Fliegertruppe into the Luftstreitkräfte by October 1916.

List of FFAs

Notes

References
 Van Wyngarden, G. (2006). Early German Aces of World War 1, Osprey. Oxford. 
 O'Connor, M. (2001) Airfields & Airmen – Ypres, Leo Cooper. 
 Cowin, H. W. (2000) German and Austrian Aviation of World War 1, Osprey. Oxford. 

Imperial German Army Air Service